Arsenio González Gutiérrez (born 9 March 1960 in Yudego) is a former Spanish cyclist. He was a professional cyclist from 1983 to 1998.

Palmarès

1982
1st Volta da Ascension

1983
1st Stage 5b Vuelta a Cantabria
2nd overall Vuelta a La Rioja

1987
3rd overall Prueba Villafranca de Ordizia

1988
1st Stage 5 Volta a Catalunya

1989
2nd overall GP Torres Vedras
1st Stage 6

1990
3rd overall GP Torres Vedras

1996
1st Circuito de Getxo
1st Clásica Sabiñánigo
2nd overall Prueba Villafranca de Ordizia

Grand Tour Results

Source:

Tour de France
1988: 97th
1992: 20th
1993: DNF
1994: 40th
1995: 23rd
1996: 24th
1997: DNF

Vuelta a España
1983: 33rd
1984: 50th
1985: 35th
1986: 43rd
1991: 52nd
1992: 24th
1993: 23rd
1994: 24th
1996: 36th
1997: 47th
1998: 31st

Giro d'Italia
1995: 21st
1997: 52nd
1998: 55th

References

1960 births
Living people
Spanish male cyclists
Sportspeople from the Province of Burgos
Cyclists from Castile and León